The 2016–17 Canberra United W-League season was the club's ninth season in the W-League, the premier competition for women's football in Australia. The team played home games at GIO Stadium, McKellar Park and Central Coast Stadium.

Players

Squad information

Transfers in

Transfers out

Contract extensions

Managerial staff

Squad statistics

Competitions

W-League

League table

Results summary

Results by round

Fixtures
 Click here for season fixtures.

References

External links
 Official Website

Canberra United FC seasons
Canberra United